John Constantine is a fictional character who appears in American comic books published by DC Comics. Constantine first appeared in Swamp Thing #37 (June 1985), and was created by Alan Moore,  Steve Bissette, and John Totleben.

The titular Hellblazer, Constantine is a working-class warlock, occult detective, and con man from Liverpool who is stationed in London. He is known for his endless cynicism, deadpan wit, ruthless cunning, and constant chain smoking, but he is also a passionate humanitarian driven by a heartfelt desire to do some good in his life. Originally a supporting character who played a pivotal role in the "American Gothic" Swamp Thing storyline, Constantine received his own comic in 1988. The musician Sting was a visual inspiration for the character.

The Hellblazer series was the longest-running and most successful title of DC's Vertigo imprint. Empire ranked Constantine third in their 50 Greatest Comic Characters of All Time, while IGN ranked him number 29 in its Top 100 Comic Book Heroes, and the character ranked number 10 in Wizards Top 200 Comic Book Characters of All Time.

The character made its live-action debut in the film Constantine (2005), played by Keanu Reeves. On television, Constantine was played in the television series Constantine by Matt Ryan, who later reprised the character in the Arrowverse series Arrow, Legends of Tomorrow, and The Flash, and several animated productions. Jenna Coleman later portrayed a female version of the character (and her ancestor) in the television series The Sandman, adapting both Constantines' roles from the comic series.

Some writers who have written his stories have claimed to “see” him.

Creation and conception
John Constantine first appeared in 1985 as a recurring character in Swamp Thing, in which he acted as a "supernatural advisor" to the main character.

In these early appearances, Constantine was depicted as a sorcerer of questionable morality, whose appearance was based on that of the musician Sting (specifically, as Sting appeared in the films Brimstone and Treacle and Quadrophenia). Alan Moore created the character after artists Steve Bissette and John Totleben, who were fans of The Police, expressed a desire to draw a character who looked like Sting. They had already drawn at least one character in Sting's likeness, a briefly glimpsed background figure wearing a black-and-red-striped T-shirt in Swamp Thing #25. In his earliest Swamp Thing appearances, the character is drawn with a marked resemblance to Sting, and in Swamp Thing #51, Constantine appears on a boat with the name The Honourable Gordon Sumner on the bow.

John Constantine's official debut was not until Swamp Thing #37, when he was drawn by Rick Veitch and Totleben. Crisis on Infinite Earths #4, his second official appearance in a cameo role, shipped two weeks after the release of Swamp Thing #37. In that issue, written by Marv Wolfman and drawn by George Perez, Constantine is wearing a green suit as opposed to his more traditional black suit and tan trenchcoat ensemble.  Moore describes Constantine as being drawn from a number of "really good ideas ... about serial killers, the Winchester House, and ... want[ing] to draw Sting in a story". Calling these disparate strands a "big intellectual puzzle", Constantine was the result of "fit[ting] it all together". Initially created "purely to get Sting into the story", by the time of the 1985 San Diego ComicCon, Moore stated, "It's turning into something more than that now." Veitch's contribution was to give Constantine an earring, something he considered risque for 1985.

Asked in 1985 about the similarities between John Constantine and the character Baron Winters (from Marv Wolfman and Gene Colan's Night Force), Moore revealed that he was a "big fan" of Wolfman and Night Force, but that "no intention to rip off Baron Winters" existed. He said:

Constantine and Winters met each other during Moore's run on Swamp Thing and again in Neil Gaiman's The Books of Magic.

Speaking to comics magazine Wizard in 1993, Moore elaborated:

In 1988, Constantine was given his own title, Hellblazer. In 1993, at the launch of DC's Vertigo Comics imprint, Hellblazer was made an official Vertigo publication. It was the longest continuously published Vertigo title. Before the launch of the Vertigo line, Constantine appeared in several DC Universe titles, but for many years afterwards, editorial policy forbade the use of Constantine outside the Vertigo line. The policy was reversed in 2011, when a version of Constantine appeared in the DC Universe crossover series Brightest Day, a spin-off series, Brightest Day Aftermath: The Search for Swamp Thing. In 2011, Peter Milligan added him to the inaugural key roster of The New 52 series Justice League Dark. Milligan began writing Justice League Dark while also writing the Vertigo's Hellblazer series, being a writer of both series at the same time. In an interview, Milligan told Newsarama:

Beginning in Justice League Dark #9, Jeff Lemire assumed writing duties on the series, replacing Milligan, who had remained on the Vertigo title. Lemire said he considers Justice League Dark his dream gig at DC Comics because Constantine is one of his all-time favourite characters not just in comics, but in all fiction. Lemire also teased that while Constantine, Zatanna, and Deadman would remain on the roster, the team would change in his opening arc and expand.

Characterization

Although a compassionate humanist who struggles to overcome the influence of both Heaven and Hell over humanity, and despite his occasional forays into heroism, Constantine is a foul-mouthed, disillusioned British cynic who pursues a life of sorcery and danger. His motivation has been attributed to an adrenaline addiction that only the strange and mysterious can satiate. He also seems to be something of a "Weirdness Magnet" (a term also used to describe 
Constantine). He is shown to be someone with a wide and international circle of contacts and allies, and is adept at making friends. At the same time, his close friends inevitably suffer or are outright killed simply by being in his life; this has left a severe mark on him. In #69, when the King of Vampires killed the man sleeping beside him and casually asked if he had been a friend, John replied, "Must be. He's dead."

Magical powers
Constantine also has a reputation as being one of the most powerful sorcerers in the world. Despite this, he rarely uses magic, instead choosing to use his wits to trick his opponents. Constantine is also referred to as "The Constant One" because of his whole family tree being somewhat connected to the occult. Many of his ancestors are sorcerers from different eras of history, and have taken part in many known historical events. Some of his ancestors have roles in other works outside Hellblazer, such as Batman: The Order of Beasts, The Sandman, and Books of Magic.

Sexuality
Constantine is bisexual, which was first established in a 1992 comic that referred offhandedly to his having male and female exes. Early stories exclusively showed him dating women, although Ashes & Dust in the City of Angels showed him as having relationships with men, as well. His romantic relationships in the New 52 have included numerous partners, most significantly Zatanna, as well as the sorcerer Nick Necro; all have been fraught with distrust and mutual disappointments. The relaunch Constantine the Hellblazer #1 (2015) reaffirmed Constantine's bisexuality through his interactions with male and female characters in the issue. Later issues of Constantine the Hellblazer depicted John falling in love with a male bartender named Oliver, whom he dated. In the 2020 film Justice League Dark: Apokolips War, Constantine reveals that King Shark is his ex.

Attire
While Constantine has worn many clothes over the years, he was originally portrayed as often wearing a blue pin-stripe suit, tan trench coat, and occasionally gloves. As the series progressed, his trademark attire became a grungier (or perhaps the same, just older) trench coat, white shirt, and black tie, but eventually returned more to his earlier fashion. Constantine smokes Silk Cut cigarettes, consuming 30 or so a day. Constantine also occasionally breaks the fourth wall, where he talks to the reader and narrates the story himself.

Real-time aging
Constantine is unusual among comic-book characters in that he has aged in real time since his creation. During the first year of his solo series, Constantine celebrated his 35th birthday. In the relevant issue, Constantine is reading a newspaper when he notices the date on the cover is his birthday, making his date of birth May 10, 1953. Five years later, on May 10, 1993, he turned 40. In Hellblazer, it was mentioned multiple times that the aging process of Constantine himself might be different due to the demon blood that he obtained from Nergal. In a 2011 interview, DC co-publisher Dan DiDio said, "Constantine in the Vertigo universe is in his 60s, and what you have in the DC Universe is a character who is markedly younger".

Fictional character biography

Youth
In Constantine's early appearances in Swamp Thing, his past was a mystery; his life as a child and young adult was not developed until Jamie Delano's Hellblazer stories. John Constantine was born in Liverpool, Lancashire (now Merseyside), on May 10, 1953. He was raised an Everton football club supporter. His mother, Mary Anne, died giving birth to John and his stillborn twin brother because an earlier abortion—forced on her by John's father, Thomas—had weakened her womb. Because he was unable to accept responsibility for his wife's death, Thomas blamed John and the pair grew up with a deep dislike for one another. While in the womb, John strangled his twin brother with his own umbilical cord; in a parallel universe, the twin survives to become the well-loved and well-adjusted magician who John never was.

In their childhood, John and his older sister Cheryl lived briefly with their aunt and uncle in Northampton to escape from their father's alcoholism and subsequent imprisonment for stealing a female neighbour's underwear. They moved back to Liverpool when their father was released. John's bloodline and ancestry were known as the Laughing Magicians, legendary mages who have the power over synchronicity and were infamous for bluffing and tricking gods. This ancestry later drives John Constantine to partake in his lineage and practice magic. One of John's first acts of magic, as a child, was to hide all of his childhood innocence and vulnerability in a box to rid himself of it. Later, in the 1960s, a teenaged John ran away from home, but not before a botched curse caused his father to become withered and frail. John eventually made his permanent home in London in 1969, rooming with Francis "Chas" Chandler, a young man who has since gone on to become John's closest  and longest-surviving friend.

During the 1970s, John became involved in occult circles in London. He travelled other countries and visited San Francisco, where he met, and subsequently began a relationship with, the female magician Zatanna Zatara (in DC's The New 52, but the two met in New York). He also became enamoured of punk rock; after seeing the Sex Pistols at the Roxy Club in London in 1977, John cut his long hair, called himself Johnny Con-Job, and formed his own band, Mucous Membrane, whose members included Chandler (as a roadie), a drummer named Beano, and fellow Liverpudlian Gary Lester. They later released an album called Venus of the Hardsell. John also performed as a famous stage magician in the 1980s, where he became famous for predicting the assassination attempt on U.S. President Ronald Reagan.

John's first venture into occult "heroism" was a disaster. On tour with Mucous Membrane at the Casanova Club in Newcastle, he found the aftermath of a magical orgy gone horribly wrong; an abused child, Astra Logue, had conjured a hideous monster that took revenge on her father, the club's debauched owner, and the other adults who were tormenting her, and the monster refused to leave. With typical recklessness, John convinced some members of the band, along with several occultist friends, to try destroying the creature by summoning a demon of their own. Unfortunately, this demon was not under their control; and after it had destroyed the child's monster, it tormented Constantine's friends and took the child to Hell. John had summoned the demon by one of its names, but not its true name – Nergal – which would have been required to bind and control the demon. Nergal went on to be a regular antagonist throughout the series. John suffered a nervous breakdown after this incident, and was committed to Ravenscar Psychiatric Hospital, which he drifted in and out of over the years.

The guilt of Astra hung over him for many years, until in his mid-40s, he used some magic and con-artistry to free not only her, but also the souls of all the other children trapped in Hell. As for the rest of the "Newcastle Crew", the incident left the group both physically and psychologically scarred. After helping Dream retrieve his sands from Constantine's own dying ex-girlfriend Rachel, Dream in turn relieves Constantine of the nightmares that had plagued him since the incident.

Occult "hero"
John is later freed from Ravenscar by London gangsters, threatening to torture and kill his sister and her family unless he helps to resurrect a mob boss's dead son. Knowing that resurrection is impossible even by magical means, John instead summons a demon to take the boy's place; a desperate act that has bloody consequences many years later. Years later, John was able to reconvene the surviving members of the "Newcastle Crew" to help with his investigation of the Brujería cult, as seen in Swamp Thing #37–49. The cult murdered most of them, including John's then-lover, Emma. These people, and others who have died due to John's carelessness, have continued to appear to him as silent, reproachful ghosts. Chas is the most prominent one of very few human friends to have survived a long-term association with John.

John first met Swamp Thing in 1985 after being interested in the creature. John later acts as the Swamp Thing's protector, guide, and voice of omen, even teaching the Thing to amplify his powers. Both would have further adventure with each other, such as John introducing the Thing to the Parliament of Trees, Thing using John's body to make love to his wife and father a child named Tefe, and fighting off the Damnation Army from summoning the Anti-Christ. Both carry a dull, but nevertheless fruitful friendship with each other. Constantine even invites Swamp Thing to his 40th birthday and assures the Thing he will try not to bother him again. In 1991 while in his late 30s, John contracted terminal lung cancer. During this time, he sought the help of a dying friend, Brendan, who had sold his soul to the First of the Fallen, the most powerful lord of Hell. When the First came to collect the soul, John tricked him into drinking holy water, which rendered him helpless and prevented him from collecting the friend's soul at the appointed time.

For this, the First promised to make John suffer unprecedented torment in Hell when he dies. Slowly dying from cancer, John hatched a plan to save himself from eternal torment. He secretly sold his soul to the other two Lords of Hell. When they discovered Constantine's actions, they realized that they could not allow him to die, or else they would be forced to go to all-out war over his soul, a war whose only winner would be "the Lord of the Hosts", i.e., God and his angels. They were also far too stubborn and proud, however, to enter anything resembling an alliance. As a result, they were forced to cure John of his cancer. This led to the First plotting a grand revenge on Constantine, who manipulated the demon via his ally Ellie, a succubus, into coming into a trap; the plan only barely succeeded, and while the First was temporarily defeated, many of John's friends were killed.

Constantine then went on to have a series of adventures and misadventures playing the role of puppet and puppeteer with his signature style and profane sarcasm. He managed to free Astra and every other child in Hell, but at the cost of the First returning to power; also, as part of the scheme, John's worst attributes were given separate existence as "Demon Constantine", which meant he himself could not go to Hell. As part of an attempt to regain his nastier edge, he used Ellie, and this led to her taking out a revenge scheme in 1998 that forced him to turn to the First for help; Ellie ended up in Hell, and several of John's oldest friends left him. John, being tired of all this, contacted God. God appears and the two converse in a campfire. John then tells him his reason for contacting Him. He warns God that if his soul is ever sent to Hell, he would easily take over, and do nasty things such as unleashing the demons and locking away Hell so that the damned cannot enter and have no resting place. John blackmails God to do his bidding, and that is to keep his soul away from Hell. God, knowing of John's abilities, does so, but warns him of what will come next.

The 21st century
On return to Britain in 2003, and after reconciling with his sister (who believed he was dead), he went on to be involved in a magic war in London, and was horrified to find his niece Gemma, whom he had wanted to keep out of this life, had become a witch. He soon ended up organising a counterstrike against a creature known as the Shadow Dog, having been warned of its coming and believing it was an entity that brought death and madness; instead, it was a guardian against the true enemy, the Beast, who was manipulating John into giving it free access to humanity. In the process, he was rendered an amnesiac, leaving him vulnerable to the schemes of the demon Rosacarnis. To get his memories back, he had to spend a day in her service, in which she had him father three demonic children, who went on to massacre anyone who knew Constantine, from friends to enemies to people who had only briefly met him. Among them was his sister Cheryl; one of his sons had exploited her husband's religious fanaticism to make him see his wife as a witch — and thus a person to be killed. This forced Constantine to go on journey to Hell in the hopes to return his sister's soul. Accompanying him was Nergal, the demon he thought he had killed by sending him to the border of Heaven.

While in Hell, John and Nergal met Demon Constantine, who tried to kill the original one. John was forced to let Nergal enter his body  to finish him. Later, they also encountered Ellie, who seemed to have quite pardoned John for him selling her out to the First. She was not subject to any torture or punishment, either. The couple finally arrived at Rosacarnis' hall, where there was a feast with all three of Constantine's children, the First, and many demons from all Hell. Because of Nergal's earlier possession of his body, any damage done to John would be mirrored on Nergal. Nergal, however, calls the bluff, showing that the effect goes both ways by clawing at his chest slightly. John begs Rosacarnis to kill him to save his sister, but just as she is about to, the First of the Fallen intervenes and immediately kills Rosacarnis, since Constantine's soul is his by "right of insult" and will only be taken when he deems fit. The First also kills Rosacarnis' two sons, but spares the daughter, who had been dealing with issues of identity and had doubts about whether she wanted to continue to exist.

Following this, the First commands Nergal to release the soul he is holding. Cheryl's soul is pure and innocent, and does not belong in Hell, but the First offers her a truly devilish deal. He informs her that her husband, Constantine's brother-in-law Tony, has killed himself with her blood still staining his hands, thus making him twice damned, and offers to fairly divide her husband's punishment between the two of them if she stays of her own free will. Constantine attempts in vain to argue that Tony murdered her and does not deserve that mercy. Despite all that has happened, Cheryl still loves her husband enough to accept the First's deal and decides to stay. Constantine can do nothing, as the First gloats over his victory and then sends him back home. Unable to look at his niece Gemma's tear-filled eyes because of his failure, Constantine runs barefoot down the stairs and into the Liverpool night.

Lost brother
John later revisits Ravenscar Asylum, the place where he was thrown after being framed for Astra's murder. John remembers all the maltreatment he suffered, and remembers every suffering and guilt he had for the past years. At first, it appears as though it is too much for him and that he will be overtaken by the images of the ones he has hurt, but the being turns into the form of a baby. This baby, who is the sum of all his guilt and self-hatred, is then promptly thrown off a cliff near the asylum and into the sea. After killing the creature, Constantine is now free, and becomes even a bit more cocky and picks back up his earlier style from the beginning of his book and his appearances from Swamp Thing: a double-breasted blue suit underneath his trench coat, and slicked-back, gelled hair.

Later on, a Sudanese shaman who had first bound the hunger demon Mnemoth has been having dreams of Constantine and a war-mage named Mako, who is coming to kill him and devour his being.  Constantine is a specific target of the war-mage because he is the "Laughing Magician", who is also known as the "Constant One". Mako wants to devour him so he can absorb that power and have his being made a fixture of the universe. To counter this attack to come, the African magus puts a dream of his into a tree root, with Constantine's true nature in those dreams. After doing this, a young man is sent as a messenger to find John and deliver the message. Constantine later notices that something is wrong on the synchronicity lines, and, seemingly, he is going head first against the traffic. Remembering that Mako mentioned Ravenscar when he found out about Constantine, he tries to summon his unborn brother, but instead is summoned to his brother. The soul of Constantine's brother tells John that he was not to be born and that it should have been he who had been born, instead, as he is the Laughing Magician; he requests that John and he merge their souls so  they become one and can fix the world. They had previously attempted this, but John was apparently too strong-willed. John then makes the link that the soul of his unborn brother caused him to get cancer and for his relationships to fail, and that anytime he tried to take control of his life, something bad would happen to make John weaker, so their souls might be able to merge. After realizing this, John cuts the soul of his brother out of his own soul, so he can control his life and live his way.

Later life
In the 2010s, John entangles himself in further adventures. He goes to India and fights a ghost of a British soldier of the Sepoy rebellion, fights a Babylonian shape shifter named Julian, gets his thumb cut off to contact Shade: The Changing Man, marrying a young girl named Epiphany Greaves, who was also the daughter of an infamous gangster, looking for his lost trench coat that his niece sold, finding his sister's long-lost son named Finn, and finally getting his sister's soul from Hell.

By 2013, John was contacted by the Three Fates, who tell him that he will finally die in five days. Having lived a good and adventurous life, John happily accepts his fate rather than trying to fight it like he always does. When the fifth day comes, John Constantine is murdered in his own home, when he is ambushed and killed by a gangster. His funeral is attended by many of his friends and family, but it later turns out that he had faked his death yet again. Constantine decides he should keep a low profile, because he does not want to hurt the people around him again. He bids farewell to Finn and Epiphany, and finally visits Gemma. In the meanwhile, Gemma, hearing about her uncle's return from the Fates, tries to kill herself with a poisonous revolver, but Constantine sneaks the last remaining dart from his niece. Gemma says her life will be better without him, because he takes up too much of it and she is either hating him or loving him too much. John suggests he let her be, but Gemma fears he will return and put her life to misery. John tells Gemma to make her own decision, and she reluctantly points the revolver at him. Gemma closes her eyes before muttering, "Damn you, John Constantine" and pulls the trigger, but when she opens her eyes again, Constantine has vanished. The last scene shows Constantine in the Long Journey's End bar, holding a glass of liquor with a vacant look.

The New 52
In The New 52, Constantine appears as one of the lead characters in Justice League Dark. His history is slightly altered, such as meeting Zatanna in New York instead of San Francisco, and the origins of how he got his trademark trenchcoat. During the gap where he travels the world to learn magic, the New 52 added the history of him meeting Nick Necro, who was implied to be John's mentor and original owner of the trenchcoat. The Forever Evil: Blight storyline would establish that the three characters were all involved in a magical pact and a love triangle, which fell apart due to Zatanna ending her relationship with Nick to pursue John. Nick states "We were all in love, and you two shut me out!" The character also stars in the ongoing series Constantine, which replaces Hellblazer. He is still an unsavory trickster in the New 52 universe, as, while during the Trinity War between the three Justice Leagues, he tries to trick Shazam (15-year-old Billy Batson) so that he can steal his magic. He fails, causing Billy to become even more distrustful of other people than he already was.

In Constantine #14, it was revealed that John Constantine, as a boy, was taught and cast his first magical spell—at the cost of the lives of his parents and his house burning down (it was implied that his mother, unlike in Hellblazer, survived the childbirth). It was also revealed that he spent his childhood in the '80s in Liverpool, England (it is not shown if he had any siblings, like Cheryl Constantine in Hellblazer). The one who taught John his first spell was Tannarak from the Cult of the Cold Flame (Constantine #15).

His primary enemies in Constantine are Mister E, Sargon the Sorceress (the original Sargon's daughter), and Tannarak: all are members of the Cult of the Cold Flame. Together with his allies Papa Midnite, the psychic mage Spellbinder, and a witch called Julia Everheart, Constantine attempts to destroy the Cult by conspiring a scam to take Sargon and Tannarak by surprise. However, prior to the planned battle, Constantine is thrown into the battlefield in Dar es Salaam in World War I because of a ritual going wrong, making his plan ultimately fail. An encounter with Doctor Occult there results in Constantine being transported to Earth-2 - a world dying under siege from Darkseid and his army of Parademons.

In Earth-2, he is assaulted by the Parademons, but Wotan comes and rescues him, before trapping him to open a gateway to escape the dying Earth. Constantine manages to convince Wotan to spare his life, then works with the ancient sorcerer to open a door through his body to Earth-0. As Wotan enters the doorway, he is split into two halves, because there are two John Constantines in this world: the original Constantine and the native one of Earth-2, who is surrounded by his friends and even gets married. After the death of Wotan, Constantine resolves to find his Earth-2 counterpart. He travels to Liverpool and witnesses all the horror and despair of the dying world. As soon as John reached the destination, he is shocked to find his "parents" (actually the Earth-2 John's parents), his friends Gary Lester, Chas Chandler and his former love interest Maureen still alive.

The Earth-2 John quickly attacks him by grabbing him in the neck, but they are engulfed in visions of their lives in parallel right after: a dangerous life marred with sorcery, adventures and regrets of Earth-0 John and a much quieter, much happier life of Earth-2 John. Constantine quickly earns the trust of the Earth-2 family, who consider him to be a wonder. Together, they escape to a warehouse where John instructs them to draw sigils to cast a complex spell. As John is lecturing about the unpredictability and the price of magic, Doctor Fate appears in front of his eyes, claims to have foreseen his arrival and offers to help him.

Doctor Fate reminds John of an incoming horde of Parademons and tells him to quickly cast the spell to escape from the dying world, himself hoping to flee with John and the family too. John discovers that the spell requires one Constantine to die: either himself or the Earth-2 John. As the Parademons storm in and take each family member down one by one, John is torn over between saving his own life and let the good, honest Earth-2 John live by sacrificing himself. Finally, he chooses to save his own skin: as he is kissing the other John, he holds his hand and drives the knife into his heart, ultimately killing the "other John". As the spells start working, John casts an additional spell to trick Doctor Fate, which masks his presence from the ancient sorcerer, then departs, brings along the family members and many other people.

By killing the "proper" Constantine, he earns the wrath and hatred of the Earth-2 family. Being called "Devil", John corrects the family when they reach Heaven while peeling through the layers of the dying world: Heaven itself, also under assault from Darkseid's force, has closed its door and started departing, deeming this world beyond salvation. Later, John and his entourage are attacked by Doctor Fate, who managed to detect Constantine's whereabout. Despite succeeding in countering the assault, John loses his "mother" Mary-Anne, who is dragged back by Fate's chain. This greatly traumatizes Thomas Constantine, John's father, who even attempts to commit suicide, but is talked out of it by John.

After a long and hard trip, Constantine finally makes it back home, but Darkseid has sensed him and is in hot pursuit. As the menacing hand of the Apokolips God is reaching out for him, Constantine enacts his "last trick": by sacrificing some souls of his entourage, John manages to get enough power to cast the "Ring of Dolus" spell, which uses every happy memory, every pleasant thought, every piece of hope in John Constantine to swirl a magical "web" made of lies. This powerful spell helps John project an illusion of an already dead universe to fool Darkseid, while John manages to bring himself, the family and the Earth-2 civilians to safety, and even pickpockets some survivors back from Darkseid's clutch.

As Constantine lands in the Jurassic Coast, England, he is confronted by Thomas, who points a gun at his head. Tired of everything, John yells at his father, and begs him to kill him off for good. Unable to do it, Thomas drops the gun, but Maureen quickly puts it up and prepares to shoot John, while questioning his actions. John contemplates and sees that while he is no hero, he is the only one willing to sacrifice the "proper John" to save his family, or to trade a hundred people for the safety of 6 billion. He magically teleports away, leaving the family and the survivors behind. Later, John goes back to New York and visits his old friend Lloyd at his bar to tell him about his latest adventures.

The New 52 Constantine series ends at issue #23 and was relaunched as Constantine: The Hellblazer written by Ming Doyle and James Tynion IV in June 2015.

The Constantine Futures End tie-in tells the story of John Constantine five years into a possible future of the New 52 universe. He somehow obtains the ultimate occult artifact, the Helmet of Fate, and manages to trick and kill the ancient magician Nabu with the help of an old ifrit.

John Constantine's origin in the New 52 universe is seemingly retconned in the Secret Origins series. In the story, a group of kids in Liverpool manages to get their hands on an occult book and uses it to summon a magical creature called Legendbreaker to discover Constantine's true origin. Instead, the creature tells three conflicting stories: one featuring John's mother dead in childbirth, leaving him to his abusive father; another having John Constantine being born in a loving family with proud and doting parents; and last one with John born in an unremarkable family, but with a mad older sister who is (probably) possessed by a dark force. They all lead to the death of his entire family and set the path for John Constantine into the world of magic and to the fateful incident in Newcastle, although the actions and consequences are different. The creature tries to claim the souls of the young "mystics", but the real John Constantine shows up and chases it away. He tells the kids to go back home, forget what has just happened, and that his true origins will forever remain unknown - but it does not matter.

John Constantine stars in the DC You title Constantine: The Hellblazer written by Ming Doyle and James Tynion IV. The title introduces John in a new outfit and new hairstyle, in his own adventures, unrelated to superheroes business.

Constantine uses magic to trick a cashier in a clothes store and gets himself a new suit. He pickpockets a passenger, uses the money to buy a meal in a small restaurant and gets acquainted with its owner Oliver, a single father of two daughters. As John is busy chatting and flirting with Oliver an old "friend", the demon Blythe, pulls John away and convinces him to help them solve their problems in their latest business place, a soul farm. They want John to eliminate their business partner, which John completes, and he also cons Blythe into banishing herself back to Hell. Suddenly, John sees his entire ghost entourage, and Gary Lester's ghost - who has tried to warn him since the beginning - tells him that Frank North's spirit has vanished completely, and something has been after John's ghosts. John tries to set up a scheme to lure and trap the entity which had been after his ghosts, by ramping up quite a number of ghosts from 'haunted sites'. The plan fails and Gary Lester's ghost is also taken by the being. After a few flashbacks and meeting with an old acquaintance named Georgie, John begins to unravel the true identity of the ghost-hunting entity, as his (and Georgie's) old time lover, Veronica. After releasing Veronica's soul, Constantine starts to notice (and is also warned by other beings whom he deems as 'friends') the increasing number of supernatural activities in New York city. Being part of Neron's grand scheme, John manages to (after quite a bit of struggle) con Neron into thinking that the souls he had claimed were worthless, and leaving New York city for good. Albeit the cost of Oliver's soul, which Blythe had claimed by previously blackmailing him and John with the souls of his daughters.

DC Rebirth
In The Hellblazer: Rebirth, John gets back to London to remove the curse placed upon him (originally shown in Constantine #3, which makes him physically sick whenever he sets foot on London soil) and resumes his adventures in the new DC Rebirth-initiative The Hellblazer. The series restores many of the traditional aspects of the original Hellblazer run while still remaining firmly in the larger DC Universe, restoring his original backstory and featuring old allies such as Chas, Mercury and the Swamp Thing.

John Constantine returns to England and is greeted by his old time friend, Chas Chandler, at the airport. He resolves to dispel the curse, set on him by a demon called "Laughing Boy", whom he once crossed in the past, by using a ritual that deflects the curse from him to 8 million souls in London. Shazam and Wonder Woman make an appearance - they notice the ravens in London dying and prepare to intervene, while the Swamp Thing appears before them and tells them that they should trust Constantine on this one. The "Laughing Boy" demon tells John that he will return Astra's soul if John agrees to cancel his spell. However, it turns out that John is buying time for the psychic Mercury, who is now a young woman, to arrive and tell him the real name of "Laughing Boy" (Nybbas). John takes control of the demon, cancels the curse and London returns to normal.

In the past, it is shown that the djinn have tried to hide away the secret of their existence from human. One djinn, named Marid, was stopped by his brother when he tried to prevent the assassination of Archduke Franz Ferdinand, which triggered World War I. In South London, present day, John Constantine is staying in Chas's house when he is contacted by Swamp Thing. Abigail Arcane, the Avatar of the Rot and the Swamp Thing's lover, is missing. John enlists Mercury's help, who is eager to help the Swamp Thing despite disliking John. Meanwhile, in Paris, Marid resurfaces and attacks his brother.

John tells Chas which horse to bet on and makes the cabbie drive him to the Tate Club. Clarice Sackville offers him a deal with "someone", but John flatly refuses. That "someone" turns out to be Marid, who is shown working with Clarice, with Constantine seeming to be an obstacle to their plans. John is tracked down by two djinn but manages to escape to the London Underground. He meets Map, who behaves oddly and warns John of an upcoming danger in town: the djinn, and that Clarice actually wants John to stop the djinn from finding the Swamp Thing. John returns home only to find Chas tied up and gagged by a gang of white supremacists, who have managed to deduce that Chas's winning bet was due to John, and force the con man to tell them how to win bets. While John is "doing magick", Marid and his djinns arrive and kill off the gang, and John and Chas manage to escape.

Mercury and the Swamp Thing travel in the Rot to find Abigail Arcane. Mercury jumps into a "wormhole" while the Swamp Thing stays behind and battles the forces of the Rot. Mercury returns and rescues the Swamp Thing. When asked what she found, Constantine arrives and answers "djinn".

The Sandman Universe
In another universe first seen in Books of Magic, Constantine is caught in the middle of a magical war that will destroy the universe at the hands of Timothy Hunter. Constantine sacrifices Chas to buy himself time, but is fatally wounded by Chas' taxi sign. Constantine encounters the prime Tim Hunter and tells him that all of this destruction is his fault and he wishes that he had listened to Mister E and killed him. After Tim leaves, Constantine meet an alternate, older version of himself who offers to save him for a price, which is that John has to be the best version of himself. As John starts to lose consciousness, he realizes that he is not ready to die yet and agrees to the deal. He later wakes up in Ravenscar Asylum, back in the prime universe.

Once in this new universe, John discovered that Chas is dying of lung cancer and is plagued by various demons and spirits, caused by spending so much time around John. Chas angrily renounced their friendship. After visiting Chandler, John tried to kill the Timothy Hunter of this universe to prevent Hunter's supposed descent to darkness, but stopped midway. He managed to gain the reluctant service of Vestibullan - a former angel who had refused to take side during the war between Hell and Heaven, and had been punished ever since.

After being thrown out of a bar for making jokes ridiculing the British Royal family, John made acquaintance with its bouncer, Nat, a Glaswegian girl who was an excellent martial artist. John was kidnapped by the "mob boss" called K-Mag, the leader of a street gang consisted of wayward immigrant youngsters. His henchmen, the "Ri-Boys", had been trying to sell drugs in a nearby park, but were killed by what they thought to be angels.

K-Mag employed Constantine, who he knew was a magician, to deal with these "angels", by blackmailing John over one of his gangster, Noah, 's life. John agreed, and discovered that these were not really angels, but magical beings created by a homeless man who was obsessed with William Blake. Constantine tricks the man into killing himself, hence destroying the "angels". He also managed to bring Noah out of the gang and made the young man his personal driver like his former friend Chas. However, the residual energy of the encounter was later revealed to be absorbed by the old Constantine.

John then met a fellow sorcerer, the hippie Tommy Willowtree (formerly Thomas Spugg), who tells him that the angels in the park were just one of a series of magical occurrences that have happened since John's return. Willowtree revered John and offered him back his "birthright" as the "Magelord of England". It turned out that due to Constantine's sudden disappearance, the Tate Club's leader, Clarice Sackville, and her associate resorted to find and brand the young Willowtree as their "champion". Together, the reluctant Constantine and Willowtree managed to solve a minor problem by one of Constantine's former associate turned enemy, and stopped the ravens of the Tower of London from attacking foreign visitors. Unknown to them, these events were caused by the alternate  old John, who managed to attack and crucify the young Willowtree.

John visited Noah's mother, who had been comatose for seven years, in a hospital. He encountered a ghostly presence of a young xenophobic British woman who attacked and murdered all patients in the critical ward who had foreign background - but not Constantine, a British man. It turned out to be a hateful projection of an old lady who had been bedridden for three years and could do nothing but watched and directed her hatred, especially immigrants, which Noah solved by visiting her room and putting flower next to her deathbed.

John tried to track down his old version's signal, which led him to a fishing town. He discovered Freddie, an young fisherman who found himself out of luck with his business as well as being held with contempt by his fellow fishermen, all of whom were subscribing to xenophobic ideals from a British Conservative politician called Clem Thurso. The old John gave Freddie a whistle, which he used to summon a mermaid who was madly in love with him. Freddie used the mermaid to fish and to kill his rival French fishermen. When the fish resource started to dry up, Freddie turned to capture the mermaid and slice off her flesh to sell, as he found out she had self-healing powers, despite her pleas and her being pregnant with his offspring. John rescued the mermaid and waited until she finally delivered and died from childbirth, to catch Freddie and kick him down the river for his monstrous human-mermaid hybrid children to eat him alive.

The old John had also made acquaintance with a Duke (an allegory to Prince Andrew), who was desperate to gain the favor of his mother, the Queen. Old John supplied him with horse semen and promised of a majestic, fast, powerful being. The Duke ordered his men to bring Constantine in to help with the birth of the creature, only to capture the younger John. John warned the Duke of the creature but was ignored. The creature, supposed to be a beautiful unicorn, turned out to be absolutely grotesque; it stabbed its way out of its mother's womb and killed all the other mares at the stable. John explained that the creature was born purely out of an idea and was supposed to represent one thing: purity, and it could only be calmed down by purity of a barely legal virgin readily in the Duke's car, before John euthanized it. Later, John was chased down by one assassin sent by the Royal family due to fear of embarrassment by this scandal, but he thwarted the attempt on his life.

Appearances and mentions
 John Constantine appears in an early issue of Neil Gaiman's The Sandman. There in 1989, he helps Dream recover a pouch of sand which had served as one of Dream's totems of power. John had purchased the pouch during Dream's imprisonment and it had then been stolen from him by an ex-girlfriend. John and Dream find the woman using the sand as a drug and driven mad by it. Dream recovers the pouch, granting the woman a peaceful death at John's request and promising to end the nightmares John had been having "ever since Newcastle". John's ancestor Lady Johanna Constantine also plays a significant role in storylines of The Sandman and an Elizabethan-era "Jack Constantine" is mentioned.
 In another of Gaiman's comics, The Books of Magic, John is at hand to show the hero Timothy Hunter around the then-present day DC Comics Universe, along with Mister E, Doctor Occult and the Phantom Stranger. He later appears several times in both the monthly "Books of Magic" series and several mini and maxiseries featuring Timothy Hunter.
 During a crossover, Constantine met Shade, The Changing Man during the Hotel Shade era, by Peter Milligan and Chris Bachalo. Constantine also makes a small cameo in Vertigo's Lucifer. In issue #5 he is seen drinking at Lucifer Morningstar's bar Lux, among guests that seek an audience with Lucifer about the gateway to the void outside of creation. According to himself he's not there to propose a trade with Lucifer, only to take "a quick look at the field". Lucifer Morningstar makes a return cameo in Hellblazer #192. Lucifer writer Mike Carey wrote Hellblazer #175–215.
 Constantine is one of the few people aware of the Crisis on Infinite Earths, and one of the few to have foreseen it. Although longtime allies Zatanna, the Phantom Stranger and Swamp Thing are still either active or frequently referred to in the DCU's world of superheroics, the world of Hellblazer became more realistic and no mention was made of John's interactions with superheroes, which included attending the funeral of Hal Jordan uninvited, drinking with Doom Patrol member Mento, meeting Batman, attending the opening of Guy Gardner's Green Lantern theme bar, helping an incarnation of the Challengers of the Unknown save London from one of the Millennium Giants and, in his own comic, playing host to a stoned Zatanna at his fortieth birthday party. He does complain about superheroes not getting in trouble for collateral damage as he does at the beginning of The Fear Machine story arc. Constantine was slated to be a main character of the aborted company-wide crossover Twilight of the Superheroes, but the project was ultimately shelved.
 John Constantine can be seen in a panel in Neil Gaiman's Batman: Secret Origins story "When is a Door". In it, a film crew is asking people on the street what they think of Gotham's super-villain problem, John is shown smoking a cigarette, responding "Sorry squire, I'm not from 'round here' make that 'no comment. Though it is not stated that this is Constantine, he has the same appearance, speaks in a decidedly British fashion, and this would not be the first cameo Gaiman has given him in a comic. The story was later reprinted as an extra in Gaiman's "Whatever Happened to the Caped Crusader". In Mike Grell's run on Green Arrow, Constantine briefly met Oliver Queen/Green Arrow in a London pub, telling him to mention his name to the dark forces in Sherwood Forest, although Queen ignored the request.
 In the final issue of the Brightest Day series, Constantine appears on the last page, remarking "Bollocks" at news that a new Swamp Thing has appeared. Constantine starred in Brightest Day Aftermath: The Search For Swamp Thing, a three-issue mini-series that saw John interact with various DC superheroes during his pursuit of the new Swamp Thing. DC Co-Publisher Dan DiDio stated that the John Constantine in the DC Universe will be closer to his original incarnation while Constantine in Vertigo's Hellblazer would continue unaffected. After Swamp Thing's resurrection by the White Lantern, Constantine is shown looking over the bodies of the polluting executives Swamp Thing has just killed.
 John Constantine appears in DC Comics' prestige format three-issue series Batman: Damned, which debuted in September 2018.

Analogues
 The character of Jack Carter in Warren Ellis and John Cassaday's comic book series Planetary is an analogue of John Constantine; he fakes his death and turns into an analogue of Ellis' Spider Jerusalem, stating that with the 1980s over, it's "time to be someone else": this has been interpreted as Ellis criticizing the Constantine character for being too tied to his origins as a reaction to 1980s politics and stating that more modern characters have since taken on his mantle.
 Constance Johanssen, a blonde, chain-smoking British woman in a trenchcoat was also created by Ellis for his Pryde and Wisdom series for Marvel Comics, described as "Constance Johanssen. Excellent occult detective. Has a habit of getting her friends killed. Two hundred at last count."
 A Bat-Mite version of John Constantine appeared in Batman: Mitefall.
 Grant Morrison originally wanted Constantine to become a supporting character in their Doom Patrol series, but DC's editorial policy at the time prevented Constantine from making extended appearances in superhero comics, for fear of spoiling the realism of Hellblazer. As a result, Morrison created the magus Willoughby Kipling. It was revealed in Hellblazer #51 that they and Constantine have met, and they had a brief voice-over cameo in Warren Ellis' JLA: Classified story "New Maps of Hell".
 Ambrose Bierce is the name of a character intended to be John Constantine in Phil Foglio's Stanley and His Monster limited series, but changed at the last minute due to editorial policy. Gregori Eilovotich Rasputin played a similar role for Firestorm and Captain Atom as Constantine did for the Swamp Thing, while Hellblazer was a Jack Kirby-style reinterpretation of the character who appeared in Doom Patrol #53 and The Books of Magic Annual #3.
 According to actor Misha Collins, the wardrobe of the character Castiel on the TV show Supernatural is based on that of John Constantine.
 In the CrossGen title Mystic No. 15, magical characters from different literature, including DC and Marvel's sorcerers, made some appearances in a bar. John Constantine appears in the background.
 A reference to him was made in the Marvel Universe in Hellstorm #2, where a full description of Constantine was made by Doctor Strange and Hellstorm while sitting and talking in a bar. Hellstorm described him as a Brit who "smokes like a fiend."

Influences
Hellblazer boosted the popularity and image of the occult detective fiction genre and shaped it into its modern form. Many modern examples of the genre such as Hellboy, Supernatural, Grimm, The Originals, and The Dresden Files have been influenced by the character. Many imitators of both the series and its character flourished such as Criminal Macabre, Gravel, Planetary, and others. Its elements and style have been used countless of times in other works and many analogues of the cynical John Constantine have appeared.

Powers and abilities
Unlike other comic book magicians, Constantine's portrayal of skills prior to the New 52 onwards did not often use his magical abilities, choosing to primarily rely on his wits, knowledge of the occult, manipulation of opponents and allies, and an extensive list of contacts. Although his skills in spell-casting are described to be of average ability, his key areas of focus include demonology, demonic summoning, illusions, and divination although he also has some skills in other areas such as necromancy and spiritual communication. When using sorcery, Constantine is armed with the knowledge of many magical spells, rituals, and curses, such as evocation, necromancy, illusions, invisibility, and even magical time travel. He has a wide range of protection magic such as sigils and magic circles that can protect him from both physical and supernatural attacks. Constantine's skills as a sorcerer were increased after the New 52 reboot, adding other magical powers such as teleportation, counter spells, elemental magic, telekinesis, and immobilization. He can use magic to reflect damages done to him onto his enemies. John also carries with him an arsenal of powerful magical artifacts to aid him in battle, such as The House of Mystery, which also serves as his transport to different realms of the universe, and his trademark trench coat that possesses powerful demonic powers.

John's most signature supernatural ability is synchronicity wave travelling, which is an instinctual supernatural ability for Constantine to make his own luck. This has led John to uncanny luck at games of chance, the ability to avoid and escape harm, meet the right kind of ally to help prevent or stop an apocalyptic event from happening, and reshape the battle he's fighting to his own accord. Constantine is highly resistant to many psychic attacks such as telepathy, possessions, and mind control. He can even use magic to block off omnipresence, seen where he once used sigils to hide himself from the First of the Fallen.

Aside from sorcery, Constantine excels in manipulation, known to have deceived many of the most powerful beings in the DC Universe, such as The First of the Fallen and The Presence, as well as manipulating Batman and Superman. He is considered by many the world's greatest con man. Constantine is one of a few people knowing all the routes to Heaven, Hell, and the afterlife, which he uses to escape and teleport without the danger of being chased by enemies. In the graphic novel Pandemonium, he once allowed himself to be killed, but later resurrects himself by exiting the afterlife. Constantine also  exhibited considerable mastery in "stage magic skills"—hypnosis, sleight of hand, pick pocketing and escapology. Constantine's skill at unarmed combat varies depending on the writer. Some portray him as a poor physical fighter, others as a capable hand-to-hand combatant. Over time he has won occasional fights using magical weapons, by fighting dirty, or by quick-thinking.

After tricking the Lords of Hell into curing his lung cancer, he was perpetually in good health and physicality. Constantine's blood is demonically tainted, initially by a blood transfusion from the demon Nergal, and later by sex with a succubus. His blood has been shown to have healing properties, and is noted to have an age-managing effect. It also acted as a defence mechanism when attacked by the King of the Vampires, as it is highly corrosive and poisonous.

In real life
Alan Moore claims to have met his creation on two occasions. In 1993, he told Wizard magazine:

His second meeting with his creation was illustrated in 2001's Snakes and Ladders, an adaptation by Eddie Campbell of one of Moore's performance art pieces:

They met a third time in fiction, when Moore was written into issue #120 of Hellblazer by then-author Paul Jenkins. Moore is seen sitting in silhouette at the back of a bar as John Constantine (who is on a pub crawl with the reader) raises a drink to him.

Writers who had their run on the Hellblazer series have also admitted meeting the character in real life. A rumour has persisted for many years that the Liverpool occult writer Tom Slemen served as a model for Constantine. Slemen has always denied this. Original Hellblazer writer Jamie Delano also claims to have encountered Constantine, during his run on the character, outside the British Museum. Peter Milligan saw Constantine at a party around 2009 and rushed after him, only to find he'd disappeared. Brian Azzarello once saw him in a Chicago bar but avoided him, saying that "the thing about John is, the last thing you'd want to be is his friend."

Reception
The character won the 1986 "Favourite Supporting Character" by Eagle Award, followed by winning it again in the same category a year later. In addition to being ranked third in Empire magazine's 50 Greatest Comic Characters and being ranked No. 10 in Wizard Magazines Top 200 Comic Book Characters of All Time, he is also listed in IGN's Top 100 Comic Book Heroes as No. 29, stating that "John Constantine is pretty low on the totem pole as far as DC's magical players go. But through a combination of guile, trickery, and plain old ornery charm, Constantine battles the worst Hell has to offer and lives to tell the tale. Constantine is a byproduct of both the punk rock era and Margaret Thatcher's Britain. He isn't very nice, he drinks and smokes like they're both going out of style, and his friends always seem to pay for his own magical misdeeds. And yet we can't help but love this crusty old magician all the same." In 2013, ComicsAlliance ranked Constantine as #30 on their list of the "50 Sexiest Male Characters in Comics".

The character also garnered some negative reception, where UGO.com listed both Constantine and Zatanna in UGO's the Dirtiest Comic Book Sex Scenes, where they comment that, "One DC heroine who often finds herself unlucky in love is the backwards magician Zatanna, who can never seem to find a quality dude. One of the most fulfilling relationships she's had to date is with that reprobate  John Constantine, who is the very definition of a "love 'em and leave 'em" kind of dude. The pair hooked up a number of times but their respective worldviews were just too different, plus he's straight Vertigo and she's wiping minds in the Justice League. The commute would be hideous." During Brian Azzarello's run on the series, the Ashes & Dust in the City of Angels story arc gained controversy for portraying Constantine in a bisexual relationship, though it wouldn't be the last time Constantine's bisexuality was explored.

Fandomania.com ranked the film Constantine in No. 13 of their Ultimate 20 Comic Book Film Adaptations, stating that Keanu Reeves's performance "was good", although saying it might have been better if "played by the person the character was originally modelled after: Sting of the Police." TopTenz.net ranked him No. 5 in Top 10 Comic Book Anti-Heroes, saying that "Just knowing John Constantine is likely to get you killed: during his comic's run just about every member of his supporting cast has either been killed, maimed, mutilated, tortured and coerced into making deals with fiends from the Pit. And yet Constantine goes on, a supernatural warrior willing to pay almost any price to keep the darkest evil at bay. In recent times Constantine has got rid of the guilt and self-loathing plaguing him by magically giving it the physical form of a baby and throwing it off a cliff. What a magnificent bastard..."

Sonia Harris from Comics Should Be Good praised Hellblazer, saying that "watching John delve into his past in order to exorcise his (and the worlds) literal and metaphorical demons is a delight. Simon Bisley does an incredible job of visually contrasting the pretty young version of Constantine with the imposing man he has become. Time and misadventure have scarred and hardened John, and the man he has become has the strength and will to transform his environment by channelling the anger that pained him so much as a young, fresh-faced, suicidal punk kid."
Constantine ranked 30th on ComicsAlliance's 50 Sexiest Male Characters in Comics list that even though almost all of his relationships end badly, they can't warn others against his wily charms. The character of John Constantine has been analyzed as a stereotypical depiction of a European in fiction.

In other media

Television
 John Constantine appears in Justice League Action, voiced by Damian O'Hare as an adult and by Paula Rhodes as a child. This version is a member of the Justice League.
 John Constantine appears in Constantine, portrayed by Matt Ryan. The series followed Constantine's journeys across America alongside his friend Chas and a young woman named Zed, who is being hunted by a demon. Along the way, he solves supernatural mysteries, vanquishes demons, and clashes with officious angels sent to watch over him.
 Ryan reprises his role in the Arrow episode "Haunted" as a guest star. In flashbacks, he first meets Oliver Queen on the island Lian Yu, where he introduces Oliver to magic and gives him a tattoo for magical protection after Oliver saves his life. In the present, Oliver calls in a favor from John, who helps him restore the soul of his friend Sara Lance after she is resurrected by a Lazarus Pit.
 Ryan reprises his role in the third season of Legends of Tomorrow in a recurring capacity, in which he requests Sara's help in exorcising a young girl possessed by the demon Mallus, who the Legends have been fighting throughout the season. In season four, Constantine joins the Legends, with Ryan joining as a series regular.
 Ryan reprises his role in The Flash episode "Crisis on Infinite Earths: Part Three", in which he attempts to resurrect Oliver by calling in a favor from Lucifer Morningstar.
 John Constantine appears in Constantine: City of Demons, voiced again by Matt Ryan.
 In The Sandman, Jenna Coleman portrays a female version of Constantine named Johanna Constantine and her identical ancestor, respectively adapting the roles of John and Johanna Constantine from the original The Sandman comics. While mourning Astra Logue, whom Constantine accidentally banished to Hell and suffered recurring nightmares about ever since, the latter assists Dream in retrieving his sands from Constantine's dying ex-girlfriend Rachel. After making her passing comfortable with his namesake, Dream relieves Constantine of her nightmares.
 In October 2022, Coleman confirmed that she, Neil Gaiman, and Allan Heinberg had discussed a potential spin-off series about her character, stating that it was "good idea" which they were "really behind".
 John Constantine appears in the Harley Quinn episode "It's a Swamp Thing", voiced by Matt Ryan.

Film
 John Constantine appears in Constantine, portrayed by Keanu Reeves. This version is an American, based in Los Angeles, and possesses the psychic ability to see "half-breeds" as they truly are. These are a result of teenage Constantine viewing them, leading to a suicide attempt that damned him to Hell. In addition, he carries the ability to render invisible beings in his proximity visible via the incantation "Into the light I command thee" and two tattooed magical glyphs, and possesses Christian relics as his primary exorcism tools. In the film's novelization, it is explained that Constantine comes from a Christian culture and he has a greater natural understanding of the power of Christian relics, which makes it easier for him to use them. Additionally, Constantine's exorcisms are motivated by a desire to redeem himself for his past suicide, but they are constantly doomed to fail as everything he has done has fundamentally been for his own benefit rather than for the selfless betterment of others. A sequel with Reeves reprising his role was confirmed to be in development by September 2022.
 John Constantine appears in Justice League Dark, voiced again by Matt Ryan. 
 John Constantine appears in Justice League Dark: Apokolips War, voiced again by Matt Ryan.
 John Constantine appears in Constantine: The House of Mystery, voiced again by Matt Ryan.

Video games
 John Constantine appears in Constantine, voiced by Dave Fouquette.
 John Constantine appears in DC Universe Online, voiced by Shannon McCormick. He resides within the Hero Garrison in the Gotham Wastelands and appears as a boss in the villain campaign. He also appears in the House of Legends, Justice League Watchtower, and Hall of Doom as a vendor.
 John Constantine appears in Scribblenauts Unmasked: A DC Comics Adventure.
 John Constantine appears in Raiden's ending for Injustice 2 as a founding member of the Justice League Dark. Additionally, Constantine's daughter Rose appears in Doctor Fate's ending while Constantine himself was originally set to appear as a playable character, but was cut for unknown reasons.
 Constantine appears as an unlockable playable character in Lego DC Super-Villains as part of the "Justice League Dark" DLC pack.

Miscellaneous
 John Constantine appears in the Justice League of America: Wedding Special.
 John Constantine appears in Smallville Season 11.
 John Constantine appears in The Sandman audio drama episode "Dream A Little Dream of Me", voiced by Taron Egerton.

See also
 List of Hellblazer publications

References

External links

 Qusoor: Hellblazer Index
 Roots of the Swamp Thing: Swamp Thing Timeline
 Hellblazer Trade Index
 Qusoor: Alan Moore interview - The Sting connection

British superheroes
The Books of Magic
Characters created by Alan Moore
Comics about magic
Comics characters introduced in 1985
DC Comics characters who use magic
DC Comics characters who can teleport
DC Comics fantasy characters
DC Comics LGBT superheroes
DC Comics male superheroes
DC Comics television characters
DC Comics telekinetics
Vertigo Comics characters
Fictional bisexual males
Fictional characters with cancer
Fictional characters from California
Fictional characters who can manipulate time
Fictional characters with dimensional travel abilities
Fictional characters who have made pacts with devils
Fictional characters who can turn invisible
Fictional characters with elemental and environmental abilities
Fictional characters who can manipulate probability
Fictional characters with evocation or summoning abilities
Fictional con artists
Fictional demon hunters
Fictional escapologists
Fictional exorcists
Fictional gamblers
Fictional occult and psychic detectives
Fictional people from Liverpool
Fictional rock musicians
Fictional singers
Fictional wizards
Twin characters in comics
Hellblazer
Time travelers
Superhero film characters
LGBT characters in animation
Fictional people from the 20th-century